A comedy club is a venue—typically a nightclub, bar, hotel, casino, or restaurant—where people watch or listen to performances, including stand-up comedians, improvisational comedians, impersonators, impressionists, magicians, ventriloquists, and other comedy acts. The term "comedy club" usually refers to venues that feature stand-up comedy, as distinguished from improvisational theatres, which host improv or sketch comedy, and variety clubs (which may also host musical acts).

Types

Comedy clubs are usually broken down by comedians into "A rooms", "B rooms", and "C rooms":
A rooms usually cater to people with movie deals, people with television shows, and generally well known acts.
B rooms are where the best aspects of both A rooms and C rooms meet. Young comics need B rooms as a stepping stone. These are rooms where someone doing a 10- to 15-minute set (hosting/MCing) can be asked, after they've been going up long enough, to do a 20-minute set (featuring) and so on. These clubs also typically allow dirtier material, since they can become established names for "dirty" comedy or shows that usually cover adult themes.
C rooms act as "neighborhood" comedy clubs, for the most part. The headliners are not usually very well known or popular, and the audiences are random walk-ins.

List of notable clubs

 Bananas Comedy Club
 Carolines on Broadway
 Catch a Rising Star chain
 Cobb's Comedy Club
 Coconuts Comedy Club
 Comedy Cellar
 Comedy Club Russia
 The Comedy Clubhouse (Barcelona)
 The Comedy Store
 The Comedy Store (London)
 The Comic Strip Live
 Comedy Works in Denver, Colorado, U.S.
 Dangerfields
 The Empire in Belfast
 The Funny Bone
 The Glee Club chain
 Gotham Comedy Club
 Governors Comedy Club
 The Improv
 Jongleurs chain
 The Laff Stop
 The Laugh Factory
Off the Wall Comedy Empire, Jerusalem, Israel
 The Punchline
 The Stand Comedy Club in Glasgow, Edinburgh and Newcastle upon Tyne
 The Stress Factory
 The TakeOut Comedy Club Hong Kong
 Yuk Yuk's

Improv

 ComedySportz
 iO Theater
 The Groundlings
 The Second City
 Upright Citizens Brigade Theatre
 Dad's Garage Theatre Company

References

External links

 
Stand-up comedy